Alexander Smith House may refer to:

Alexander Smith House (Brentwood, Tennessee), listed on the National Register of Historic Places
Alexander Smith House (Madison, Wisconsin), another historic house